Grand Prix d'Isbergues is a professional cycle road race held in Isbergues, Pas-de-Calais. Since 2005, the race has been organised as a 1.1 event on the UCI Europe Tour. A women's race was added in 2018 as a 1.2 event.

Winners

Men

Women

External links
  

UCI Europe Tour races
Cycle races in France
Recurring sporting events established in 1947
1947 establishments in France